Harold Clarke (1888 – 11 March 1969 in Christchurch, Canterbury, New Zealand) was a British diver who competed in the 1908 Summer Olympics,  in the 1920 Summer Olympics, and in the 1924 Summer Olympics.

In 1908 he was eliminated in the semi-finals of the 3 metre springboard competition. Twelve years later he finished ninth in the plain high diving event. In 1924 he won the bronze medal in the plain high diving competition.

References

External links
profile

1888 births
1969 deaths
British male divers
Olympic divers of Great Britain
Divers at the 1908 Summer Olympics
Divers at the 1920 Summer Olympics
Divers at the 1924 Summer Olympics
Olympic bronze medallists for Great Britain
Olympic medalists in diving
Medalists at the 1924 Summer Olympics
20th-century British people